Apocrine glands are a type of exocrine gland, which are themselves a type of gland, i.e. a group of cells specialized for the release of secretions. Exocrine glands secrete by one of three means: holocrine, merocrine and apocrine. In apocrine secretion, secretory cells accumulate material at their apical ends, and this material then buds off from the cells, forming extracellular vesicles. The secretory cells therefore lose part of their cytoplasm in the process of secretion.

An example of true apocrine glands is the mammary glands, responsible for secreting breast milk. Apocrine glands are also found in the anogenital region and axillae.

Apocrine secretion is less damaging to the gland than holocrine secretion (which destroys a cell) but more damaging than merocrine secretion (exocytosis).

Apocrine metaplasia

Apocrine metaplasia is a reversible transformation of cells to an apocrine phenotype. It is common in the breast in the context of fibrocystic change. It is seen in women mostly over the age of 50 years. Metaplasia happens when there is an irritation to the breast (breast cyst). Apocrine-like cells form in a lining of developing microcysts, due to the pressure buildup within the lumen. The pressure build up is caused by secretions. This type of metaplasia represents an exception to the common rule of metaplasia increasing the risk for developing cancer in that apocrine metaplasia doesn't increase the possibility of developing breast cancer.

Apocrine ductal carcinoma in situ

Apocrine ductal carcinoma in situ  (ACDIS) is a very rare breast carcinoma which is regarded as a variant of the ductal carcinoma in situ breast tumors. ACDIS tumors have microscopic histopathology features that are similar to pure apocrine carcinoma of the breast tumors but differ from them in that they are completely localized, i.e. have not invaded nearby tissues or metastasized to distant tissues.

Apocrine carcinoma

Apocrine carcinoma is a very rare form of female breast cancer. The rate of incidence varies from 0.5 to 4%. Cytologically, the cells of apocrine carcinoma are relatively large, granular, and it has a prominent eosinophilic cytoplasm. When apocrine carcinoma is tested as a “triple negative", it means that the cells of the patient cannot express the estrogen receptor, progesterone receptor, or HER2 receptor.

References

External links
 Diagram at uwa.edu.au

 
Exocrine system